Cytoskeleton-associated protein 4 is a protein that in humans is encoded by the CKAP4 gene.

CKAP4 also historically known as CLIMP-63 (cytoskeleton-linking membrane protein 63), or just p63 (during the 1990s) is an abundant type II transmembrane protein residing predominantly in the endoplasmic reticulum (ER) of eukaryotic cells and encoded in higher vertebrates by the gene CKAP4.

Discovery 

CLIMP-63 was discovered in the early 1990s as the most S-palmitoylated protein during mitosis, Nevertheless, the effect of this modification to date remains unclear. CLIMP-63 was extensively studied during the 1990s by the group of Hans-Peter Hauri (University of Basel, CH) which has characterized CLIMP-63's life in the ER. More recently, different groups have also reported CLIMP-63's presence at the plasma membrane acting as a ligand-activated receptor. CLIMP-63 has also now been described as a marker in different cancers.

Localization, molecular functions and regulation 

CLIMP-63's cellular distribution has been assessed (and re-assessed) several times in the last two decades. The protein includes a cytosolic segment composed of positively charged amino acid (2–23) which might act as a preponderant motif for folding and ER localization. Furthermore, CLIMP-63 was one of the first discovered ER-shaping proteins. and is mostly known for participating in the generation and maintenance of the ER sheets  This is thought to occur after dimerization of CLIMP-63's luminal COILED-COIL domains in cis (two CLIMP-63 proteins of the same ER membrane layer) and/or trans (between two different ER membrane layers, across the ER lumen). Multimerization might in addition limit CLIMP-63's diffusion out of ER-sheets.

CLIMP-63 was also shown to bind microtubules through its cytoplasmic disordered tail which might help anchoring the ER-sheets to the cytoskeleton. This is regulated by phosphorylation of at least three serine residues of CLIMP-63's cytosolic tail (S3, S17 and S19) as phosphorylation interferes with CLIMP-63's microtubule binding capacity.

In addition, CLIMP-63 can undergo another post-translational modification, S-palmitoylation, on cysteine 100 of its cytoplasmic domain. So far only the palmitoyl-acyltransferase ZDHHC2 has been identified as a potential regulator of CLIMP-63's palmitoylation but as ZDHHC2 resides mostly at the plasma membrane, supplementary investigations are needed. The consequence of S-palmitoylation remain to be investigated but could play a role in the cell cycle as CLIMP-63's palmitoylation was reported to strongly increase during mitosis.

Finally, CLIMP-63 has been shown by different groups to serve as a cell surface receptor for various extracellular ligands, in particular for surfactant protein A (SP-A) in lungs alveoli, tissue plasminogen activator (tPA) in vascular smooth muscle cells  and for anti-proliferative factor (APF) in bladder epithelial cells of patients with interstitial cystitis disorder.

Diseases 

More recently, CLIMP-63 has been related to different types of cancer prognosis. Upregulation of CLIMP-63 is observed in cholangio-cellular and hepatocellular carcinoma and it correlates with lymph node metastasis appearance.

References

Further reading

External links